Universidade FUMEC (Fundação Mineira de Educação e Cultura, FUMEC University) is a private and non-profit Brazilian university in Belo Horizonte, state of Minas Gerais.

With its 50th anniversary coming FUMEC is part of the group of best universities in the state of Minas Gerais, ranking the second highest private university in the state according to General Index of Courses provided by Ministry of Education, and RUF(Brazilian Universities Ranking) which is the main study regarding universities in Brazil.

Numbers 
 15,000 students undergraduate and Graduate Students;
 Faculty: 72% have Masters and Ph.D’s;
 Technical and Administrative support: 504 employees;
 FUMEC University invests more than R$970,000.00 a year in outreach projects encouraging interdisciplinary activities and services for the benefit of the community;
 FUMEC University invests R$2,641,000.00 a year of its funds in research projects in several areas such as Engineering | Health Sciences | Applied Social Sciences | Human Sciences;
 Agreements  with 38 foreign universities in 18 different countries.

Undergraduate Majors 
 Accounting
 Aeronautic Engineering
 Aeronautical Sciences
 Aesthetics
 Architecture and Urbanism
 Bioenergetics Engineering
 Biomedicine
 Biomedical Engineering
 Business Administration
 Chemical Engineering
 Civil Engineering
 Civil Production Engineering
 Communication/Advertising
 Communication/Journalism
 Computer Engineering
 Computer Science
 Design
 Electrical Engineering
 Environmental Engineering
 Fashion Design
 International Business
 Law
 Mechanical Engineering
 Pedagogy
 Photography
 Psychology
 System Engineering
 Telecommunication Engineering

Undergraduate Online Majors 
 Accounting
 Business Administration
 Pedagogy
 Information Systems
 Production Engineering
 Physical Education

Technical Undergraduate Majors 
 Trade Management
 Information Technology Management
 Human Resources Management (e-learning available)
 Private Securities Management (e-learning only)
 Computer Networks
 Internet Systems
 Financial Management
 Digital Games
 Logistics
 Aircraft Maintenance
 Marketing
 Multimedia Production

Postgraduation and MBA Programs 
 MBA in Public Management (Presence and e-learning)
 MBA in Strategic Marketing (Presence and e-learning)
 MBA in Strategic Marketing
 MBA in Capital Markets and Investor Relations
 MBA in Strategic Security of Big Events
 MBA in Sustainability and Natural Resource Management
 Fashion Design
 Civil Production Engineering
 Workplace Safety Engineering
 MBA in Sustainable Buildings: Design and Performance
 Waste Management of Degraded Areas / Contaminated
 Paving and Road Restoration
 Exercise Physiology and Sports Coaching
 Systematization of Nursing (e-learning)
 Executive MBA in Business Management
 MBA in Corporate Finance and Controlling
 MBA in Tourism Business Management
 MBA in Accounting with an emphasis on international standards (IFRS / CPC)
 MBA in Strategic Project Management
 MBA in International Business Management
 MBA in Strategic Logistics Management
 MBA in Strategic Business Management (Presence and e-learning)
 MBA in Strategic Management of People (Presence and e-learning)

Master and Ph.D. Programs 
 Master and Ph.D in Business Administration
 Master in Civil Construction
 Master in Law
 Master and Ph.D Information Systems and Knowledge Management

See also
Brazil University Rankings
Minas Gerais
Universities and Higher Education in Brazil

References

External links
University homepage

FUMEC
Educational institutions established in 1965
1965 establishments in Brazil
Private universities and colleges in Brazil